A  keystone (or capstone) is the wedge-shaped stone at the apex of a masonry arch or typically round-shaped one at the apex of a vault.  In both cases it is the final piece placed during construction and locks all the stones into position, allowing the arch or vault to bear weight. In arches and vaults (such as quasi-domes) keystones are often enlarged beyond the structural requirements and decorated. A variant in domes and crowning vaults is a lantern.

Keystones, as a hallmark of strength or good architecture, or their suggested form are sometimes placed in the centre of the flat top of doors, recesses and windows for decorative effect, so as to form an upward projection of a lintel.

Although a masonry arch or vault cannot be self-supporting until the keystone is placed, the keystone experiences the least stress of any of the voussoirs, due to its position at the apex. Old keystones can decay due to vibration, a condition known as bald arch.

Architecture
In a rib-vaulted ceiling, keystones commonly mark the intersections of any two or more arched ribs.  For aesthetics, keystones are often larger than ribs in vaults and many of the voussoirs (arch stones) in arches, or embellished with a boss. 

A "dropped keystone" is one where the keystone projects lower than the other voussoirs. Following Giulio Romano, Mannerist architects of the 16th century often designed arches with enlarged and slightly dropped keystones, as in the "church house" entrance portal at Colditz Castle. Numerous examples are found in the work of Sebastiano Serlio, a 16th-century Italian Mannerist architect.

Metaphor
Keystone is often used metaphorically for an essential part on which the whole depends.

The U.S. state of Pennsylvania calls itself the "Keystone State", because during early American history, it held a crucial central position among the Thirteen Colonies geographically, economically, and politically, like the keystone in an arch. A keystone is a symbol of Pennsylvania, being used in the logos of many Pennsylvania government departments, in Pennsylvania state route signs, and on Pennsylvania car license plates, and the Shoulder Sleeve Insignia of the Pennsylvania National Guard's 28th Infantry Division (United States), a Red Keystone, first adopted in WWI in October 1918.

Gallery

See also 
 Architectural sculpture
 Coping (architecture)
 List of classical architecture terms
 Oculus compression ring

Notes

External links 

Arches and vaults
Ornaments (architecture)
Architectural elements